Adoxophyes furcatana is a species of moth of the family Tortricidae. It is found in eastern North America.

The length of the forewings is 7.5–10.5 mm. The forewings are pale yellow with light-brown markings. The hindwings are white. Adults are on wing in June and August.

The larvae feed on Platanus species. They roll the leaves of their host plant.

References

Moths described in 1863
Adoxophyes
Moths of North America